Walter Heape FRS (29 April 1855 in Brompton, London – 10 September 1929 in Tunbridge Wells) was a British zoologist and embryologist, famous for the first successful mammalian embryo transfer.

Until the age of seventeen, Walter Heape, born to a wealthy family, was taught by a private tutor and then was a student for one year at Owens College. From 1873 to 1879 he worked for a rice and sugar milling firm, then a merchant firm, and finally a cotton spinning mill before his health deteriorated and he decided to pursue a scientific career. After briefly studying physiology at Gamgee's laboratory in Owens College and then botany at Lawson's laboratory in Oxford, Heape went to Cambridge to study physiology under Foster, botany under Vines, and animal morphology under Balfour. Heape received an honorary M.A. from Cambridge on 10 December 1885. From 1879 to 1882 Heape concentrated under Balfour on mammalian embryology until Balfour's death age 30 in a mountain climbing accident. In 1882 Heape became an instructor and demonstrator in animal morphology as an assistant to Sedgwick and remained in that post until 1885. In May 1885 he was appointed the Assistant Secretary for the Marine Biological Association. On 14 December 1885 the Association appointed him Resident Superintendent to oversee the construction of the marine laboratory at Plymouth and also to conduct surveys of the marine life near Plymouth. He carried out these duties until his resignation on 1 September 1887 due to disagreements with the Association's Secretary E. Ray Lankester. Heape left Plymouth in March 1888 and then visited Egypt, Ceylon, India, Burma, and the Straits Settlements before returning to England in 1889. He was awarded a Royal Society Grant-in-Aid and a Balfour Studentship and in December 1889 left for India to collect early embryos from common langurs and rhesus monkeys. After only four months in India, Heape, suffering from illness, returned to England, having failed to collect any early embryos but being successful in preserving many female genital tract specimens of the primates.

On 27 April 1890, Heape (probably at a laboratory at his family home in Prestwich) transferred two Angora-fertilized ova from an Angora doe rabbit into the upper end of the Fallopian tube of a Belgian Hare doe rabbit which had been fertilised three hours before by a Belgian Hare buck rabbit. The Belgian Hare doe gave birth on 29 May 1890 to four offspring which appeared to be of the Belgian Hare breed and two offspring which appeared to be of the Angora breed. The Angora young were true albinos, like their presumed parents. Heape was assisted in the surgical part of the experiment by Samuel Buckley, M.D. (Lond.), F.R.C.S. (Eng.).

Heape worked at Cambridge from 1891 to 1906. In November 1897 he published a second paper on his embryo transfer experiments. In 1906 Heape was elected F.R.S.

In 1918 Heape and Horace B. Grylls introduced their invention, the Heape and Grylls Rapid Cinema Machine, capable of taking from 500 to 5000 pictures per second and useful for the study of shell bursts and armour penetration.

Heape married in 1891 and was the father of three children.

Selected publications

References

External links
Water Heape – Person – Portrait Gallery

1855 births
1929 deaths
Alumni of the University of Cambridge
20th-century British zoologists
British embryologists
Fellows of the Royal Society
19th-century British zoologists